Frank Rühle (born 5 March 1944) is a German rower who competed for East Germany in the 1968 Summer Olympics and in the 1972 Summer Olympics.

He was born in Dohna. In 1968 he was a crew member of the East German boat which won the gold medal in the coxless fours event. Four years later he won his second gold medal with the East German boat in the coxless fours event.

References

External links
 

1944 births
Living people
Olympic rowers of East Germany
Rowers at the 1968 Summer Olympics
Rowers at the 1972 Summer Olympics
Olympic gold medalists for East Germany
Olympic medalists in rowing
East German male rowers
World Rowing Championships medalists for East Germany
Medalists at the 1972 Summer Olympics
Medalists at the 1968 Summer Olympics
European Rowing Championships medalists
People from Dohna
Sportspeople from Saxony